Chambersburg and Bedford Turnpike Road Company Toll House is a historic toll house located at St. Thomas Township in Franklin County, Pennsylvania. It was built about 1818, and is a two-story, three-bay wide, limestone building.  It was owned by the Chambersburg and Bedford Turnpike Road Company until, when it was sold for $60.00.

It was listed on the National Register of Historic Places in 1977.

References 

Houses on the National Register of Historic Places in Pennsylvania
Houses completed in 1818
Houses in Franklin County, Pennsylvania
Toll houses on the National Register of Historic Places
National Register of Historic Places in Franklin County, Pennsylvania